Gonotrichidia is a monotypic moth genus in the family Lasiocampidae erected by Emilio Berio in 1937. Its single species, Gonotrichidia modestissima, described by the same author in the same year, is found in the Democratic Republic of the Congo.

References

Lasiocampidae
Monotypic moth genera
Endemic fauna of the Democratic Republic of the Congo